Gosford railway station is located on the Main Northern line in New South Wales, Australia. It serves the Central Coast city of Gosford, opening on 15 August 1887.

Between January 1960 and April 1982, Gosford was the northern extremity of the electrified network. The station buildings were demolished and replaced by the current structure which opened on 10 September 1993.

An extensive network of stabling sidings exist north and south of the station. A functioning water crane is located at the northern end of Platform 2 and is used occasionally by passing steam locomotives.

Upgrades
Work is currently in progress to create a further 58 commuter parking spaces. Work will shortly commence to create a further 26 spaces.

Platforms & services

Gosford has three platforms, one island with two faces and one side platform. It is serviced by NSW TrainLink Central Coast & Newcastle Line services travelling from Sydney Central to Newcastle. Peak-hour services travel from Central to Wyong via the North Shore line.

It is also serviced by NSW Trainlink Xplorer and XPT long-distance services from Sydney to Armidale, Moree, Grafton, Casino and Brisbane.

Transport links
Busways operate 15 routes to and from Gosford station:
32: to Spencer
33: to Somersby industrial
34: to Kariong, some services extend to Somersby, Mangrove Mountain & Spencer
36: to Westfield Tuggerah via Narara & Niagara Park
37: to Tuggerah via Settlers Park & Lisarow
38: to Wyoming
55: to Ettalong Beach & Umina Beach
63: to Saratoga via Erina Fair & Davistown
64: to Kincumber and Empire Bay
65: to Wagstaffe & MacMasters Beach
66A: to Avoca & Copacabana anti clockwise
66C: to Avoca & Copacabana clockwise
67: to North Avoca via Erina Fair & Terrigal
68: to Wamberal via Erina Fair & Terrigal
70: to Woy Woy & Ettalong Beach

Red Bus Services operate 13 routes to and from Gosford station:
17: to The Entrance
18: to The Entrance
19: to Wyong
20: to Matcham loop
21: to The Entrance
22: to The Entrance
23: to The Entrance
28: to The Entrance
40: to North Gosford loop
41: to West Gosford loop
42: to Point Frederick loop
43: to Springfield
44: to Erina Fair

References

External links

Gosford station details Transport for New South Wales
Gosford Station Public Transport Map Transport for NSW

Transport on the Central Coast (New South Wales)
Easy Access railway stations in New South Wales
Railway stations in Australia opened in 1887
Regional railway stations in New South Wales
Main North railway line, New South Wales